Hesychotypa is a genus of longhorn beetles of the subfamily Lamiinae, containing the following species:

 Hesychotypa ableptema Martins & Galileo, 1990
 Hesychotypa aeropa Dillon & Dillon, 1945
Hesychotypa albofasciatus Perez-Flores & Nearns, 2021
Hesychotypa antonkozlovi Nearns & Nascimento, 2019
 Hesychotypa aotinga Martins & Galileo, 2008
 Hesychotypa avrillasi Audureau, 2013
 Hesychotypa balia Martins & Galileo, 2009
 Hesychotypa bimaculata Dillon & Dillon, 1945
 Hesychotypa cedestes Dillon & Dillon, 1945
 Hesychotypa colombiana Martins & Galileo, 1990
 Hesychotypa crocea Dillon & Dillon, 1945
Hesychotypa danilevskyi Nearns & Nascimento, 2019
 Hesychotypa dola Dillon & Dillon, 1945
 Hesychotypa fernandezi Martins & Galileo, 1999
 Hesychotypa heraldica (Bates, 1872)
 Hesychotypa jaspidea (Bates, 1865)
 Hesychotypa lirissa Dillon & Dillon, 1945
 Hesychotypa liturata (Bates, 1865)
 Hesychotypa maculosa (Bates, 1865)
 Hesychotypa magnifica Martins & Galileo, 2007
 Hesychotypa maraba Martins & Galileo, 2007
 Hesychotypa miniata Thomson, 1868
Hesychotypa morvanae Audureau, 2012
 Hesychotypa nyphonoides (Pascoe, 1850)
 Hesychotypa punctata Martins, 1979
 Hesychotypa subfasciata Dillon & Dillon, 1945
 Hesychotypa turbida (Bates, 1880)

References

Hesychotypa
Onciderini